Kirby Burkholder is a professional basketball player. She is a 6' guard. In college, she played Division 1 NCAA basketball for James Madison University (JMU Dukes) as one of the best shooting and rebounding guards in the nation, winning numerous awards, including Conference Player of the Year. She (2014) signed contracts with both the Washington Mystics and the Azzurra Orvieto of the Italian A1 League.

Playing as a guard for Orvieto, through the first 20 rounds of the 2014-15 season, she has led her team in points and rebounds.

College career 
Kirby Burkholder, during the 2013-14 NCAA Women's Basketball season, finished among the top 7 guards in the nation for the average number of rebounds a game (she grabbed 303 in her Senior season), and among the top 100 players (including centers and forwards) in the nation with 8.7 Rebounds per game.  She finished 32nd in Free Throw Percentage in NCAA Women's D1 Basketball. She averaged 19.1 points per game during her 2013-14 senior campaign and led her team in steals.

In the 2014 NCAA women's basketball tournament, Kirby Burkholder scored 28 points and secured 18 rebounds against top 35 rebounding team Gonzaga as JMU beat Gonzaga and advanced in the 2014 NCAA women's basketball tournament.  Kirby scored 20 points and got 10 rebounds against Texas A&M.

During the regular season of her senior year in the 2013-14 season, Kirby scored 24 points and grabbed 18 rebounds vs Virginia Cavaliers, she scored 33 points against a Delaware team who had previously won 44 CAA Conference games in a row and she scored 20 points and got 2 steals vs UCLA.  In 2014 Conference tournament play, while competing against Drexel, Kirby earned a double-double which included 22 rebounds and 3 steals.  Her 22 rebounds against Drexel was a Conference "Tournament Record."

In 2014, she was named the Conference Player of the Year for the Colonial Athletic Association and was named the NCAA Women's Basketball Player of the Year for the state of Virginia by the Richmond Times Dispatch, a Virginia Newspaper.   She was also named the "2014 CAA women's basketball Scholar-Athlete of the Year."

James  Madison statistics

Source

Professional career 
Kirby Burkholder entered and became a prospect in the 2014 WNBA draft.  In April, 2014, Kirby Burkholder "signed with the Washington Mystics."  She then "signed a contract to play professionally in the Italian women’s league ... with Azzurra Orvieto of the Italian A1 League based in Orvieto, Italy."

References

American women's basketball players
Year of birth missing (living people)
Place of birth missing (living people)
James Madison Dukes women's basketball players
Living people